The 1930 Missouri Tigers football team was an American football team that represented the University of Missouri in the Big Six Conference (Big 6) during the 1930 college football season. The team compiled a 2–5–2 record (1–2–2 against Big 6 opponents), finished in fifth place in the Big 6, and was outscored by a total of 132 to 41. Gwinn Henry was the head coach for the eighth of nine seasons. The team played its home games at Memorial Stadium in Columbia, Missouri.

The team's leading scorer was John Van Dyne with 14 points.

Schedule

References

Missouri
Missouri Tigers football seasons
Missouri Tigers football